Fereej Al Nasr (also referred to simply as Al Nasr) is a district in Qatar, located in the municipality of Ad Dawhah.

Al Nasr Street, one of the main roads that runs through the district, is locally known for its high density of commercial establishments. Among its occupants are Doha Clinic Hospital which is the first private hospital in Qatar as well as barber shops, tailors, electronics shops, and stationery supplies shops. Several international restaurants, such as Turkey Central and Sidi Bou Said, are found on the street.

Etymology
The first constituent of the district's name, Fereej, translates to "neighborhood" in English. The second part, Al Nasr, is the name of the first tribe to settle this region.

Healthcare
The following healthcare facilities are located in Fereej Al Nasr:

References

Communities in Doha